Badin Express is a passenger train operated daily by Pakistan Railways between Hyderabad and Badin.

Route
 Hyderabad Junction–Badin via Hyderabad–Badin Branch Line

Station stops

Equipment
Badin Express only offers economy class seating.

References

Named passenger trains of Pakistan
Passenger trains in Pakistan